Ulrika Carlsson (born 17 April 1965) is a Swedish Centre Party politician. She has been a member of the Riksdag since 2006 and is elected from the constituency of Västra Götaland County East.

Ulrika is the Swedish Centre Partys spokesperson at educational affairs and is a former teacher herself. Between 2006 and 2010 she was a member of the parliamentary committee on education, and substitute in the committee of foreign affairs. Today she's sitting in the education committee as well as being substitute in both the foreign affairs committee and the Executive Board of Parliament. She's also a member of the War Delegation.

Ulrika is also the deputy house leader for the party, in the Riksdag.

In the Riksdag debates, she's called Ulrika Carlsson från Skövde (Ulrika Carlsson from Skövde) because of the other parliamentarian Ulrika Karlsson, from the Moderate Party, who shares the same name.

References

External links
Ulrika Carlsson at the Riksdag website

Living people
1965 births
Women members of the Riksdag
21st-century Swedish women politicians
Members of the Riksdag 2006–2010
Members of the Riksdag 2010–2014
Members of the Riksdag 2014–2018
Members of the Riksdag 2018–2022
Members of the Riksdag 2022–2026